Aoife Clark (born 6 August 1981 in Dublin, Ireland) is an Irish equestrian. At the 2012 Summer Olympics in London, England, she competed in the Individual eventing, riding Master Crusoe.

References

External links
 

1981 births
Living people
Irish female equestrians
Olympic equestrians of Ireland
Equestrians at the 2012 Summer Olympics
21st-century Irish women